The 6th millennium BC spanned the years 6000 BC to 5001 BC (c. 8 ka to c. 7 ka). It is impossible to precisely date events that happened around the time of this millennium and all dates mentioned here are estimates mostly based on geological and anthropological analysis. The only exceptions are the felling dates for some construction timbers from neolithic wells in Central Europe. 

Communities
Neolithic culture and technology had spread from the Near East and into eastern Europe by 6000 BC. Its development in the Far East grew apace and there is increasing evidence through the millennium of its presence in Prehistoric Egypt and the Far East. In much of the world, however, including north and western Europe, people still lived in scattered Palaeolithic hunter-gatherer communities. The world population is believed to have increased sharply, possibly quadrupling, as a result of the Neolithic Revolution. It has been estimated that there were perhaps forty million people worldwide at the end of this millennium, growing to 100 million by the Middle Bronze Age c. 1600 BC.

Use of pottery found near Tbilisi is evidence that grapes were being used for winemaking c. 5980 BC.

It has been estimated that humans first settled in Malta c. 5900 BC, arriving across the Mediterranean from both Europe and North Africa.

Evidence of cheese-making in Poland is dated c. 5500 BC.

The Junglefowl is domesticated around c. 5500 BC in Southeast Asia.

The Zhaobaogou culture in China began c. 5400 BC. It was in the north-eastern part of the country, primarily in the Luan River valley in Inner Mongolia and northern Hebei.

Four identified cultures starting around 5300 BC were the Dnieper-Donets, the Narva (eastern Baltic), the Ertebølle (Denmark and northern Germany) and the Swifterbant (Low Countries). They were linked by a common pottery style that had spread westward from Asia and is sometimes called "ceramic Mesolithic", distinguishable by a point or knob base and flared rims.

Indigenous Australians in what is now South Western Victoria were farming and smoking eels as a food source and trade good using stone weirs, canals, and woven traps around 6000BC.

Environmental changes
The early Holocene sea level rise (EHSLR), which began c.10,000 BC, tailed off during the 6th millennium. Global water levels had risen by about 60 metres due to deglaciation of ice masses since the end of the Last Ice Age. Accelerated rises in sea level rise, called meltwater pulses, occurred three times during the EHSLR. The last one, Meltwater Pulse 1C, which peaked c. 6000 BC, produced a rise of 6.5 metres in only 140 years. It is believed that the cause was a major ice sheet collapse in Antarctica.

Approximately 8,000 years ago (c. 6000 BC), a massive volcanic landslide off Mount Etna, Sicily, caused a megatsunami that devastated the eastern Mediterranean coastline on the continents of Asia, Africa and Europe.

In South America, a large eruption occurred at Cueros de Purulla c. 5870 BC, forming a buoyant cloud and depositing the Cerro Paranilla Ash in the Calchaquí Valleys.
Another major eruption occurred c. 5550 BC on Mount Takahe, Antarctica, possibly creating an ozone hole in the region.

The carbon-14 content in tree rings created c. 5480 BC indicates an abnormal level of solar activity.

Astronomy and calendars

The epoch of the Byzantine calendar, used in the Byzantine Empire and many Christian Orthodox countries, is equivalent to 1 September 5509 BC on the Julian proleptic calendar (see image right).

The 6th millennium BC falls entirely within the Astrological Age of Gemini (c. 6450 BC to c. 4300 BC) according to some astrologers.

References

 
-94